Traitors to All is a 1966 detective novel by the Italian writer Giorgio Scerbanenco. It is known as Betrayal in the United Kingdom. It tells the story of a former medical doctor who becomes involved in a criminal plot involving a mysterious suitcase left with him. It is the second installment of Scerbanenco's Milano Quartet and follows A Private Venus.

Publication
The novel was originally published through Garzanti in Milan in 1966. It first appeared in English in 1970, translated by Eileen Ellenbogen as Duca and the Milan Murders. A new translation by Howard Curtis appeared in 2013 in the United Kingdom and 2014 in the United States.

Reception
In 2013, Publishers Weekly described the book as an "excellent crime novel" and wrote that Scerbanenco "smartly and logically weaves all the various plot threads together".

It received the French Grand Prix de Littérature Policière for best foreign novel in 1968.

References

External links
 Italian publicity page 
 American publicity page

1966 novels
Italian crime novels
Italian mystery novels
Italian-language literature
Novels by Giorgio Scerbanenco
Novels set in Milan
20th-century Italian novels
Grand Prix de Littérature Policière winners